WPKY (1580 AM) is a radio station licensed to Princeton, Kentucky, United States. The station is currently owned by Beth Mann, through licensee Ham Broadcasting.

References

External links

PKY
Princeton, Kentucky
1950 establishments in Kentucky
Classic hits radio stations in the United States
Radio stations established in 1950